Brendan Roberto Eden Hector (born 3 February 1993 in Graaff-Reinet) is a South African rugby union player, currently playing with the . His regular position is lock.

Career

Youth

He was involved more in their 2014 Under-21 Provincial Championship campaign, starting all their seven pool matches, ending up on the winning side in all of those. He missed out on the semi-final match, but returned for the final (which was the fourth consecutive time that Eastern Province U21 reached the Division B final), coming on as a substitute to help them beat  46–3. He also appeared as a substitute as they beat  64–9 the following week to win promotion to Division A of the competition.

Eastern Province Kings

References

South African rugby union players
Living people
1993 births
People from Graaff-Reinet
Eastern Province Elephants players
Rugby union locks
Rugby union players from the Eastern Cape